"Come Thru" is a song by American singers Summer Walker and Usher. The song was released as the third single from Walker's debut album Over It, on December 28, 2019. It peaked at number forty-two on both the Billboard Hot 100 and the UK Singles Chart. The single has been certified Gold in the United States. It samples the 1997 song "You Make Me Wanna..." by Usher.

Music video
The music video for "Come Thru" was directed by Lacey Duke and it premiered on January 7, 2020. This video was shot at the 285 Flea Market in Atlanta, Georgia, the hometown where both singers are from. The video features shots of Walker riding on the back of a motorcycle, inside of the flea market, and pictured with London on da Track, who also produced the record. Usher is seen inside the Flea Mart singing to a woman and on the outside doing choreography from the original video. Jermaine Dupri makes a cameo alongside Usher in the video.

Credits and personnel
Credits adapted from Tidal.

 Summer Walker – vocals, lyrics
 Usher – vocals, associated performer, lyrics
 London on da Track – lyrics, production 
 Jermaine Dupri – lyrics, production
 Manuel Seal – lyrics
 Nija Charles – lyrics
 Ben Change – associated performer
 Kendall Roark Bailey – lyrics, production 
 Aubrey Robinson – lyrics, production 
 Nicolas De Porcel – mastering engineer
 Ashley Jacobson – assistant engineer
 Derek "MixedByAli" Ali – mixing engineer
 Cyrus "NOIS" Taghipour – mixing engineer
Danny Blair - production

Charts

Weekly charts

Year-end charts

Certifications

References

Usher (musician) songs
2019 singles
2019 songs
Songs written by Usher (musician)
Songs written by Nija Charles
Songs written by Manuel Seal
Songs written by Jermaine Dupri
Song recordings produced by London on da Track